Alpha-glucosidase inhibitors (AGIs) are oral anti-diabetic drugs used for diabetes mellitus type 2 that work by preventing the digestion of carbohydrates (such as starch and table sugar). Carbohydrates are normally converted into simple sugars (monosaccharides) by alpha-glucosidase enzymes present on cells lining the intestine, enabling monosaccharides to be absorbed through the intestine.  Hence, alpha-glucosidase inhibitors reduce the impact of dietary carbohydrates on blood sugar.

Examples and differences
Examples of alpha-glucosidase inhibitors include:
 Acarbose- Precose or Glucobay
 Miglitol – Glyset
 Voglibose

Even though the drugs have a similar mechanism of action, there are subtle differences between acarbose and miglitol.  Acarbose is an oligosaccharide, whereas miglitol resembles a monosaccharide.  Miglitol is fairly well absorbed by the body, as opposed to acarbose.  Moreover, acarbose inhibits pancreatic alpha-amylase in addition to alpha-glucosidase, and is degraded by gut bacterial maltogenic alpha-amylase and cyclomaltodextrinase.

Natural alpha glucosidase inhibitors
There are a large number of natural products with alpha-glucosidase inhibitor action.

For example, research has shown the culinary mushroom Maitake (Grifola frondosa) has a hypoglycemic effect.  The reason Maitake lowers blood sugar is because the mushroom naturally contains an alpha glucosidase inhibitor. Another plant attracting a lot of attention is  Salacia oblonga.

Clinical use
Alpha-glucosidase inhibitors are used to establish greater glycemic control over hyperglycemia in diabetes mellitus type 2, particularly with regard to postprandial hyperglycemia.  They may be used as monotherapy in conjunction with an appropriate diabetic diet and exercise, or they may be used in conjunction with other anti-diabetic drugs.

In patients with diabetes mellitus type 1, Alpha-glucosidase inhibitors use has not been officially approved by the Food and Drug Administration but some data exists on the effectiveness in this population, showing potential benefits weighted against an increased risk of hypoglycemia.

Mechanism of action
Alpha-glucosidase inhibitors are saccharides that act as competitive inhibitors of enzymes needed to digest carbohydrates: specifically alpha-glucosidase enzymes in the brush border of the small intestines. The membrane-bound intestinal alpha-glucosidases hydrolyze oligosaccharides, trisaccharides, and disaccharides to glucose and other monosaccharides in the small intestine.

Acarbose also blocks pancreatic alpha-amylase in addition to inhibiting membrane-bound alpha-glucosidases.  Pancreatic alpha-amylase hydrolyzes complex starches to oligosaccharides in the lumen of the small intestine.

Inhibition of these enzyme systems reduces the rate of digestion of carbohydrates. Less glucose is absorbed because the carbohydrates are not broken down into glucose molecules. In diabetic patients, the short-term effect of these drugs therapies is to decrease current blood glucose levels: the long-term effect is a small reduction in hemoglobin A1c level.

Dosing
Since alpha-glucosidase inhibitors are competitive inhibitors of digestive enzymes, they must be taken at the start of main meals to have maximal effect.  Their effects on blood sugar levels following meals will depend on the amount of complex carbohydrates in the meal.

Side effects and precautions
Since alpha-glucosidase inhibitors prevent the degradation of complex carbohydrates into glucose, the carbohydrates will remain in the intestine.  In the colon, bacteria will digest the complex carbohydrates, thereby causing gastrointestinal side effects such as flatulence and diarrhea.  Since these effects are dose-related, it is generally advised to start with a low dose and gradually increase the dose to the desired amount.
Pneumatosis cystoides intestinalis is another reported side effect.
If a patient using an alpha-glucosidase inhibitor suffers from an episode of hypoglycemia, the patient should eat something containing monosaccharides, such as glucose tablets.  Since the drug will prevent the digestion of polysaccharides (or non-monosaccharides), non-monosaccharide foods may not effectively reverse a hypoglycemic episode in a patient taking an alpha-glucosidase inhibitor.

See also 
 Alpha-glucosidase
 Alpha amylase inhibitor

References 

Alpha-glucosidase inhibitors